The 1978–79 Scottish Second Division was won by Berwick Rangers who, along with second placed Dunfermline Athletic, were promoted to the First Division. Meadowbank Thistle finished bottom.

Table

References 

Scottish Second Division seasons
3
Scot